The Jungle Giants are an Australian indie rock band from Brisbane, Queensland, who formed in 2011.

The band have released four full-length albums and two EPs. Their fourth studio album, Love Signs, was released on 23 July 2021.

Career

2011–2012: Early years and EPs
All four members of The Jungle Giants attended Mansfield State High School in Mansfield, Brisbane.  Singer-Songwriter-Guitarist, Sam Hales and Cesira Aitken (Lead Guitarist) played in one band and, bassist, Andrew Dooris and Keelan Bijker (Drummer) in another.

After completing school in 2009, Hales worked two jobs to fund a debut self-titled EP, which was recorded with local producer, Yanto Browning at Airlock Studios in January 2011.  Hales contributed drums, as well as vocals and guitar on the EP, with Aitken on guitar and Dooris on bass, before recruiting Bijker to complete the band. The EP was released independently in March 2011. The Jungle Giants EP contained lead single "Mr. Polite", which was picked up by Triple J Unearthed and led to widespread national touring in support of established Australian bands Ball Park Music, Boy and Bear and Last Dinosaurs.

The band's follow-up EP, She's a Riot, was released via Create/Control on 27 July 2012, drawing on life experiences and telling stories of friendships and relationships in Hales' life. In late 2012, The Jungle Giants supported Last Dinosaurs' national Satellites tour with Twinsy. This was followed by an early 2013 tour with Two Door Cinema Club, playing a series of concerts throughout Australia along with The Vaccines. On 26 January 2013, single "She's a Riot" ranked 83rd on the Triple J Hottest 100, 2012.

2013–2014: Learn to Exist

In May 2013, The Jungle Giants released "I Am What You Want Me to Be", the first track from their debut album Learn to Exist which was released 30 August 2013. The band toured Australia to celebrate the release which included both headline performances and appearances at Splendour In The Grass 2013 & Spin Off Festival. The album received positive reception overall. It was a featured album on national radio station Triple J in the week leading up to the release. The band extended the tour due to popular demand with extra shows in Brisbane, Sydney and Melbourne.

In 2014, the Jungle Giants performed on the national Big Day Out touring festival alongside acts such as Arcade Fire and Pearl Jam. They were also announced shortly afterwards to perform on the national regional touring festival Groovin' the Moo in April & May 2014, which includes performances by Dizzee Rascal, Disclosure, and Karnivool. The band additionally announced headline performances as part of the "Tuss Tour" that will take place shortly prior to their Groovin' The Moo performances, performing in Sydney, Brisbane, Melbourne and Perth.

2015–2018: Speakerzoid and Quiet Ferocity

In August 2015, the band released their second studio album Speakerzoid.

In May 2017, their song "Come and Be Alone with Me" was featured in the trailer video for series 3 of Casual.

In July 2017, they released their third studio album, Quiet Ferocity. which spawned the singles "Feel the Way I Do", "On Your Way Down", "Bad Dream" and "Used to Be in Love". At the 2018 AIR Awards, the album won Best Independent Album or EP.

2019–2021: Love Signs

On 8 July 2019, the Jungle Giants released the song "Heavy Hearted". In January 2020, the song polled at number 8 in Triple J's Hottest 100 of 2019, and became their first single to chart inside the ARIA Top 100 Singles Chart. On 17 January 2020, they released the single "Sending Me Ur Loving", which peaked at number 55 on the ARIA Singles Chart in February 2021.

On 24 May 2021, the band announced their fourth studio album, Love Signs. Love Signs was released on 23 July 2021.

2022–present: fifth studio album
On 10 March 2023, the band released "Trippin' Up"; the first taste of the band's upcoming fifth studio record.

Band members
 Sam Hales – vocals, guitar, lead songwriter, producer
 Cesira Aitken – lead guitar
 Andrew Dooris – bass
 Keelan Bijker – drums

The band members went to school together, at Mansfield State High School.

Discography

Studio albums

Extended plays

Singles

Other certified songs

Notes

Awards and nominations

AIR Awards
The Australian Independent Record Awards (colloquially known as the AIR Awards) is an annual awards ceremony to recognise, promote and celebrate the success of Australia's independent music sector.

! 
|-
! scope="row" rowspan="4"| 2018
| Themselves
| Best Independent Artist
| 
| rowspan="4"| 
|-
| Quiet Ferocity
| Best Independent Album
| 
|-
| "Feel the Way I Do"
| Best Independent Single / EP
| 
|-
| The Jungle Giants / Quiet Ferocity
| Breakthrough Independent Artist
| 
|-
! scope="row"| 2020
| "Heavy Hearted"
| Best Independent Dance or Electronica Album or EP
| 
| 
|-
! scope="row" rowspan="2"| 2021
|rowspan="2"| Sending Me Ur Loving
| Independent Song of the Year
| 
|rowspan="2"| 
|-
| Best Independent Dance, Electronica or Club Single
| 
|-
! scope="row" rowspan="2"| 2022
| rowspan="2"| Love Signs
| Independent Album of the Year
| 
| rowspan="2"| 
|-
| Best Independent Pop Album or EP
|

ARIA Music Awards
The ARIA Music Awards are annual awards, which recognises excellence, innovation, and achievement across all genres of Australian music. They commenced in 1987.

! 
|-
! scope="row"| 2020
| "Heavy Hearted"
| Song of the Year
|  
| 
|-
! scope="row"| 2021
| Konstantin Kersting for  Love Signs by The Jungle Giants 
| Engineer of the Year
|  
| 
|}

Queensland Music Awards
The Queensland Music Awards (previously known as Q Song Awards) are a series of annual awards celebrating Queensland, Australia's brightest emerging artists and established legends. They commenced in 2006.

 (wins only)
! 
|-
! scope="row"| 2013
| Themselves / "I Am What You Want Me to Be"
| The Courier-Mail People's Choice Award Most Popular Group 
| 
| 
|-
! scope="row"| 2018
| Quiet Ferocity
| Album of the Year
| 
| 
|-
! scope="row"| 2019
| "Used to Be in Love"
| Rock Song of the Year
| 
| 
|-
! scope="row" rowspan="2"| 2020
| rowspan="2"| "Heavy Hearted" 
| Song of the Year
| rowspan="2" 
| rowspan="2"| 
|-
| Pop Song of the Year
|-
! scope="row" rowspan="1"| 2022
| rowspan="1" | Love Signs
| Album of the Year
| 
| 
|}

References

External links

 
 
 
 The Jungle Giants on Triple J Unearthed

2011 establishments in Australia
Australian indie pop groups
Australian indie rock groups
Musical groups established in 2011
Musical groups from Brisbane